The 2016 Conference USA women's soccer tournament is the postseason women's soccer tournament for Conference USA to be held from November 2 to 6, 2016. The seven-match tournament will be held at the Transamerica Field in Charlotte, North Carolina. The eight team single-elimination tournament will consist of three rounds based on seeding from regular season conference play. The North Texas Mean Green are the defending tournament champions after defeating the Marshall Thundering Herd in the championship match.

Bracket

Schedule

Quarterfinals

Semifinals

Final

References 
2016 C-USA Soccer Championship

Conference USA Women's Soccer Tournament
2016 Conference USA women's soccer season